Farrukhabad Junction railway station is a main railway station in Farrukhabad district, Uttar Pradesh. Its code is FBD. It serves Farrukhabad city. The station consists of 5 platforms.

References

Railway junction stations in Uttar Pradesh
Railway stations in Farrukhabad district
Izzatnagar railway division
Farrukhabad
Transport in Farrukhabad